Christian Kühn (born 9 April 1979) is a German politician of Alliance 90/The Greens who has been serving as a member of the Bundestag from the state of Baden-Württemberg since 2013. In addition to his parliamentary work, he has been a Parliamentary State Secretary in the Federal Ministry for the Environment, Nature Conservation, Nuclear Safety and Consumer Protection in the coalition government of Chancellor Olaf Scholz since 2021.

Early life and career 
Kühn grew up in Göppingen, where he completed his high school diploma and community service and then studied political science and sociology at the University of Tübingen. After graduating in 2009, he worked as a staff member in the Dean's office of the Faculty of Economic Sciences.

Political career 
From 2009 until 2013, Kühn served as co-chair (alongside Silke Krebs) of the Green Party in Baden Württemberg. In the negotiations on a coalition government following the 2011 state elections in Baden-Württemberg, he led the Green Party's delegation alongside Krebs and Winfried Kretschmann in the Bundestag.

Kühn first became a member of the 18th Bundestag in the 2013 federal elections, representing Tübingen. In parliament, he was a member of the Committee on Construction, Housing, Urban Development and Municipalities and served as his parliamentary group's spokesman on construction and housing policy. In addition to his committee assignments, he is part of the German-Mexican Parliamentary Friendship Group.

Other activities 
 Federal Company for Radioactive Waste Disposal (BGE), Ex-Officio Chair of the Supervisory Board (since 2022)
 German Industry Initiative for Energy Efficiency (DENEFF), Member of the Parliamentary Advisory Board

References

External links 

  
 Bundestag biography 
 

 

1979 births
Living people
Members of the Bundestag for Baden-Württemberg
Members of the Bundestag 2021–2025
Members of the Bundestag 2017–2021
Members of the Bundestag 2013–2017
Members of the Bundestag for Alliance 90/The Greens